Schizopygopsis younghusbandi is a species of ray-finned fish endemic to Tibet. It occurs in the Yarlung Tsangpo River (=upper Brahmaputra) drainage and in endorheic lakes in its vicinity.

Several species and subspecies are currently considered as junior synonyms of Schizopygopsis younghusbandi. The taxonomic status of these should be re-examined as they might be distinct species.

Habitat and ecology
Schizopygopsis younghusbandi inhabits swift rivers with a rocky substrate, and mountain lakes. It is locally common.

Schizopygopsis younghusbandi has been found to be the prey species that contributed most to the diet of Oxygymnocypris stewartii, a large predatory cyprinid. On average, Schizopygopsis younghusbandi made 59% of Oxygymnocypris stewartii stomach content weight, more so among larger individuals than smaller ones.

Fishery
Schizopygopsis younghusbandi is heavily used as a food fish and is among the most important commercial species in the area.

References

Schizopygopsis
Freshwater fish of China
Endemic fauna of Tibet
Fish described in 1905
Taxa named by Charles Tate Regan